The 19th General Assembly of Nova Scotia represented Nova Scotia between 1851 and 1855. The assembly was dissolved on April 25, 1855.

The assembly sat at the pleasure of the Governor of Nova Scotia, John Harvey. John Le Marchant became governor in 1852.

William Young was chosen as speaker for the house.

List of members

Notes:

References
Journal and proceedings of the House of Assembly, 2nd [i.e. 1st] Session, 1851 (1851)

Terms of the General Assembly of Nova Scotia
1851 in Canada
1852 in Canada
1853 in Canada
1854 in Canada
1855 in Canada
1851 establishments in Nova Scotia
1855 disestablishments in Nova Scotia